The 1985–86 Tulsa Golden Hurricane men's basketball team represented the University of Tulsa as a member of the Missouri Valley Conference during the 1985–86 college basketball season. The Golden Hurricane played their home games at the Tulsa Convention Center. Led by head coach J. D. Barnett, they finished the season 23–9 overall and 10–6 in conference play to finish second in the MVC standings. The Golden Hurricane defeated Bradley in the championship game of the MVC tournament to receive an automatic bid to the NCAA tournament as the No. 10 seed in the East region. Tulsa lost to No. 7 seed Navy in the opening round.

Roster

Schedule and results

|-
!colspan=9 style=| Regular season

|-
!colspan=9 style=| MVC Tournament

|-
!colspan=9 style=| NCAA Tournament

References

Tulsa Golden Hurricane men's basketball seasons
Tulsa
Tulsa Golden Hurricane men's b
Tulsa Golden Hurricane men's b
Tulsa